Brass Mill Center is a shopping mall located in Waterbury, Connecticut.  The mall and its accompanying complex, the Brass Mill Commons, cost $160 million to build. At , it is Connecticut's fifth largest mall, containing over 130 shops. It is located off Interstate 84 in Waterbury, Connecticut.

History
The Brass Mill Center opened on Wednesday September 17th, 1997. It comprises two floors, as well as a now closed partial third floor belonging to a 12-screen Regal Cinemas.

Before construction began, 118,000 tons of contaminated soil and 63 vacant and deteriorated buildings were removed from the site.  The construction of Brass Mill Center essentially replaced the older Naugatuck Valley Mall, built in 1969 and located on the city's northeast suburban side.  In the process, the Filene's (originally a G. Fox & Co. store) and the Sears stores relocated to Brass Mill Center.  Naugautuck Valley Mall was demolished in spring 1999.
Lechmere was originally planned as the fourth anchor, but it never opened due to parent company Montgomery Ward closing the chain in 1997.

Numerous former tenants include Shaw’s Supermarket, Hometown Buffet and OfficeMax, which closed in 2007, 2011, and 2014 respectively.

On January 12, 2011, Save-A-Lot would open in the former Shaw's.

During the summer of 2017, Five Below and Ulta Beauty opened in the space formerly occupied by OfficeMax.

On June 7, 2018, Sears announced that its store would be closing as part of a plan to close 78 stores nationwide. The store closed September 2018.

On May 11, 2019, the Republican-American reported that Dick's Sporting Goods would open in the former Toys "R" Us at the adjacent Brass Mill Commons in the future, which it did on October 11.

On January 6, 2021, it was announced that Macy's would be closing as part of a plan to close 46 stores nationwide. The store closed on March 21, 2021.

On April 19, 2022, Kohan Retail Investment Group acquired Brass Mill Center for $44.9 million.

On September 26, 2022, Regal Cinemas abruptly permanently closed its location in the Brass Mill Center, which left JCPenney, Burlington Coat Factory, and Shoppers World as the only traditional anchors left.

References

External links
 Brass Mill Center website
 Brass Mill Center page at Haley & Aldrich
 New York Times: A Megamall Cornerstone for a Waterbury Revival

Shopping malls in Connecticut
Buildings and structures in Waterbury, Connecticut
Shopping malls established in 1997
Tourist attractions in New Haven County, Connecticut
Shopping malls in the New York metropolitan area
Kohan Retail Investment Group